Carboxy-terminal domain RNA polymerase II polypeptide A small phosphatase 1 is an enzyme that in humans is encoded by the CTDSP1 gene.

Interactions 

CTDSP1 has been shown to interact with SNAI1.

References

Further reading

External links